The 2017–18 season is Kitchee's 39th season in the top-tier division in Hong Kong football. Kitchee will compete in the Premier League, Senior Challenge Shield, FA Cup, Sapling Cup and AFC Champions League in this season. 

By joining the AFC Champions League, this has become the first time for Kitchee to appear in the group stage of it. On 14 March 2018, Kitchee managed to achieve a 1–0 win over Kashiwa Reysol, becoming the first-ever team from Hong Kong to win a game in the history of the AFC Champions League group stage.

Players

First Team Current Squad List (As of 20 May 2018)

Remarks: Flags indicate national team as defined under FIFA eligibility rules. Players may hold more than one non-FIFA nationality.

Out On Loan (As of 30 June 2018)

Reserves Team Current Squad List (As of 11 January 2017)

Remarks:: Flags indicate national team as defined under FIFA eligibility rules. Players may hold more than one non-FIFA nationality.

Club officials

General Structure

Club Senior Staff

Club Coach Staff

Competitions

Hong Kong Premier League

Table

Results by round

Results summary

League Matches

Hong Kong FA Cup

Hong Kong Senior Challenge Shield

Hong Kong Sapling Cup

Group stage

Hong Kong Community Cup

AFC Champions League

Group stage

Statistics

Appearances

Top scorers
The list is sorted by shirt number when total goals are equal.

Clean sheets
The list is sorted by shirt number when total appearances are equal.

See also
List of unbeaten football club seasons

References

Kitchee SC seasons
Hong Kong football clubs 2017–18 season